The Minister of Tourism is a cabinet member in the Government of France, frequently combined with Minister of Transportation, Minister of Public Works ("Ministre de l'Equipement"), Minister of Housing ("Logement"), Minister of Territorial Development ("Aménagement du territoire") and Minister of the Sea.

The current position of Minister of State for Foreign Trade, the Promotion of Tourism and French Nationals Abroad is held by Jean-Baptiste Lemoyne

Ministers of Tourism (1948 - present)
5 September 1948 - 11 September 1948 : Henri Queuille                    
11 September 1948 -  7 February 1950 : Christian Pineau                  
7 February 1950 -  2 July 1950 : Jacques Chastellain   
2 July 1950 - 12 July 1950 : Maurice Bourgès-Maunoury
12 July 1950 -  8 March 1952 : Antoine Pinay           
8 March 1952 - 28 June 1953 : André Morice                      
28 June 1953 - 19 June 1954 : Jacques Chastellain  
19 June 1954 - 14 August 1954 : Jacques Chaban-Delmas    
14 August 1954 -  3 September 1954 : Maurice Bourgès-Maunoury
3 September 1954 - 23 February 1955 : Jacques Chaban-Delmas    
23 February 1955 -  1 February 1956 : Édouard Corniglion-Molinier        
13 June 1957 -  1 June 1958 : Édouard Bonnefous                
3 June 1958 -  9 June 1958 : Antoine Pinay          
9 June 1958 -  8 January 1959 : Robert Buron                       
12 July 1972 - 27 February 1974 : Olivier Guichard                
22 March 1983 - 17 July 1984 : Édith Cresson                  
17 July 1984 - 19 February 1986 : Michel Crépeau                    
19 March 1986 - 20 March 1986 : Jean-Marie Bockel                
20 Mars 1986 - 12 May 1988 : Alain Madelin                      
5 July 1990 - 17 July 1990 : Jean-Marie Rausch                  
29 March 1993 - 18 May 1995 : Bernard Bosson                    
18 May 1995 -  7 November 1995 : Françoise de Panafieu          
7 November 1995 -  4 June 1997 : Bernard Pons                        
7 May 2002 - 2 June 2005 Gilles de Robien
2 June 2005 - 2007  : Dominique Perben
4 September 2014 – present : Matthias Fekl

References

 
Tourism